Bradstock is a surname. Notable people with the surname include:

Carla Bradstock (born 1985), Canadian volleyball player and coach
John Bradstock (born 1950), Australian rugby league player
Roald Bradstock (born 1962), English javelin thrower

See also
Burton Bradstock, a village in Dorset, England